El Salado, is a town in Álamos Municipality in the Mexican state of Sonora, in northwestern Mexico. Its population at the time of its last census was 83 persons, 47 males and 36 females.

References 

 

Populated places in Sonora
Populated places established in the 18th century